Battle of the Gods may refer to: 

Battle of the Gods and Giants or Gigantomachy, in Ancient Greek myth, often depicted in art 
Black & White 2: Battle of the Gods, a video game
Dragon Ball Z: Battle of Gods, a 2013 animated film
Theomachy ("battle of the gods"), a general term for battles involving the Ancient Greek gods